Mount Ritter is the highest mountain in Madera County, California, in the Western United States, at an elevation of . It is also the highest and most prominent peak of its namesake, the Ritter Range, a subrange of the Sierra Nevada in the Ansel Adams Wilderness of the Inyo and Sierra National Forests. Mount Ritter is the 15th highest mountain peak in California with at least 500 meters of topographic prominence.

Geography

Mount Ritter is made of strikingly dark rock and is quite prominent due to its height and isolation. It is in the middle of the Ritter Range, which includes neighboring Banner Peak and the Minarets. The prominent and memorable shape of the Ritter–Banner pair is visible from high elevations far to the north and south in the Sierra Nevada.

Mount Ritter was named by Josiah Whitney, chief of the California Geological Survey, for Carl Ritter, who had been a teacher of his when he was a student in Berlin during the 1840s.

See also

 List of highest points in California by county

References

External links

Mountains of Madera County, California
Inyo National Forest
Sierra National Forest
Mountains of the Ansel Adams Wilderness
Mount Ritter
Mountains of Northern California